Hemerodromia is a genus of dance flies in the family Empididae. There are at least 170 described species in Hemerodromia.

See also
 List of Hemerodromia species

References

Further reading

 

Empididae
Articles created by Qbugbot
Empidoidea genera